Nepolisy is a municipality and village in Hradec Králové District in the Hradec Králové Region of the Czech Republic. It has about 1,000 inhabitants.

Administrative parts
Villages of Luková and Zadražany are administrative parts of Nepolisy.

References

External links

Villages in Hradec Králové District